

References

Sussex, East
King G
King G
Lists of buildings and structures in East Sussex